Alfred Joseph Watson (26 May 1907 – 23 August 1992) was an Australian track and field athlete who competed in the 1928 Summer Olympics and in the 1936 Summer Olympics.

Family life 
The son of Thomas Watson (1866-1925), and Flora Henrietta Watson (1874-1950), née Dowell, Alfred Joseph Watson was born on 26 May 1907. His eldest brother, Russell Henry Watson (1892–1941), was an Australian amateur middle distance champion, who held titles in the mile, half-mile, and 440 hurdles. Both Alf and his older brother, Edward, attended Caulfield Grammar School from 1917 to 1919.

Early years 
Alf then attended Ivanhoe Grammar School, for whom he sprinted and competed in the high jump; In addition to being a fine Australian Rules footballer (a member of the school's First XVIII from 1922 to 1924), he also played cricket with the school's First XI from 1921 to 1924, captaining the team in 1923 and 1924, and winning the Associated Grammar Schools' batting average in 1924 (as a consequence of which he was awarded an "exhibitioner's ticket" to the Melbourne Cricket Club).

Competition 
In 1928 he was eliminated in the first round of the 110 metre hurdles event as well as of the 400 metre hurdles competition.

Eight years later he was again eliminated in the first round of both the 110 metre hurdles contest and the 400 metre hurdles event.

At the 1938 Empire Games he was a member of the Australian relay team which won the bronze medal in the 4×110 yards competition. In the 440 yards hurdles contest he finished fourth.

He announced his retirement from competitive athletics in November 1938.

See also
 List of Caulfield Grammar School people

Footnotes

References

External links
 
 
 
 
 Alfred 'Alf' Watson at Australian Athletics Historical Results
 Taylor, P., "These Days of Sport: Master of Style", The Argus, (Saturday, 7 March 1936), p.26.
 Hillhouse, A., "Story of Alf Watson: Brilliant Athlete for Twenty Years", The Junior Argus, (Thursday,  26 March 1936), p.7.
  Australia's Champions: A.J. Watson, The Sydney Morning Herald, (Friday, 27 March 1936), p.15.
 Olympic Hurdler's Success, The Argus, (Monday, 23 November 1936), p.7. and Yates's Good Time for 100 Yards Run, The Argus, (Monday, 23 November 1936), p.7.
 Sports Flashes from Many Fields: Hurdles Champion, The Canberra Times, (Monday, 13 September 1937), p.3.

1907 births
1992 deaths
Australian male hurdlers
Australian male sprinters
Olympic athletes of Australia
Athletes (track and field) at the 1928 Summer Olympics
Athletes (track and field) at the 1936 Summer Olympics
Commonwealth Games bronze medallists for Australia
Commonwealth Games medallists in athletics
Athletes (track and field) at the 1938 British Empire Games
People educated at Caulfield Grammar School
People educated at Ivanhoe Grammar School
Athletes from Melbourne
Medallists at the 1938 British Empire Games